Luciella masanensis is a species of heterotrophic marine dinoflagellates.

References

Dinophyceae
Protists described in 2007